École nationale supérieure de génie industriel (ENSGI) a French engineering College created in 1990.

In addition to its main industrial engineering training, the school hosts a training course for engineers in technological management conducted in partnership with Grenoble School of Management.

Located in Grenoble, the ENSGI is a public higher education institution. The school is a member of the Grenoble Institute of Technology.

References

External links
 ENSGI

Engineering universities and colleges in France
Grenoble
ENSGI
Educational institutions established in 1990
1990 establishments in France